Martin Roemers (born August 21, 1962 in Oldehove, Netherlands) is a Dutch photographer and artist.

Roemers studied at the AKI Academy of Visual Arts in Enschede, the Netherlands. He graduated in 1991. Roemers is known for long term projects about urbanisation and long-term effects of warfare.  His major projects include Trabant, the Warfare Project,  Relics of the Cold War, and Metropolis

Articles and reviews about Roemers' work have appeared in The New York Times, The Wall Street Journal and The New Yorker.

Trabant
His first long-term project was Trabant. The Final Days of Production (1990–1992).  Roemers, still being a student, photographed the production process of the Trabant car and made portraits of the Trabant workers. The book and exhibition of this project followed years later in 2007.

Warfare project
Roemers opted for the black-and-white portrait in his photo projects on the long-term effects of warfare. This resulted in three books and exhibitions:

 Kabul (2002): Portraits of ISAF soldiers in Kabul, Afghanistan photographed with an antique Afghan box camera.
 The Never-Ending War (2004–2005): World War Two veterans from Russia, Germany, USA, UK, Poland, Belgium and the Netherlands. The series received a World Press Photo award in 2006.
 The Eyes of War (2007–2012): Blind victims of World War Two. For this project, he made portraits of dozens of people who had lost their eyesight as children, young adults or soldiers in the violence of WW2.

Relics of the Cold War
In his book Relics of the Cold War (1998–2009) Roemers traced Cold War relics in former Eastern and Western Europe and then photographed them in situ. This generated a collection of images of tunnels, rusting tanks and abandoned nuclear missile launch pads.

Metropolis
In Metropolis (2007–2015)  Roemers photographed 22 megacities worldwide . Roemers presents these (analog) cityscapes from an elevated perspective and uses a long exposure time in which traffic and people merge into a blurred rush of energy.

Metropolis features Beijing, Buenos Aires, Cairo, Dhaka, Guangzhou, Istanbul, Jakarta, Karachi, Kolkata, Lagos, London, Los Angeles, Manila, Mexico City, Moscow, Mumbai, New York, Paris, Rio de Janeiro, São Paulo, Shanghai and Tokyo.

Exhibits and recognition
Roemers’ work has been exhibited throughout Europe, America, Asia and Australia. It is represented in Amsterdam's Rijksmuseum(60 prints) and The Museum of Fine Arts in Houston.

Roemers received two World Press Photo Awards, including a first prize for Metropolis, along with a number of other prizes.

Books (Monographs)
 Martin Roemers, De laatste lichting – The Last Batch, Het Apollohuis (Eindhoven, 1996). Introductions by Rolf Sachsse, Herman Amersfoort, 
 Martin Roemers, Tussen vijandige Buren, Mets & Schilt Publishers (Amsterdam, 2000) Introduction by Henri Beunders, 
 Martin Roemers, Kabul, Legermuseum (Delft, 2003), Introduction by Frits Baarda, 
 Martin Roemers, The Never-Ending War – De eindeloze oorlog, QV Publishers (Nijmegen, 2005).  Introduction by H.J.A. Hofland, Interviews by Martin Roemers, 
 Martin Roemers, Trabant; The Final Days of Production – Trabant; Die letzten Tage der Produktion, Wasmuth Verlag (Berlin, 2007), Introductions by Winnfried Sonntag, Achim Dresler, Kerstin Schwenn, 
 Martin Roemers, Relics of the Cold War, Hatje Cantz (Ostfildern, 2009), Introductions by Nadine Barth, H.J.A. Hofland, Martin Roemers, 
 Martin Roemers, The Eyes of War, Hatje Cantz (Ostfildern, 2012), Introductions by Cees Nooteboom, Martin Roemers, Interviews by Martin Roemers, 
 Martin Roemers, Metropolis, Hatje Cantz (Ostfildern, 2015) Introductions by Ricky Burdett, Azu Nwagbogu, Els Barents,

Books with contributions by Roemers
 Document Nederland, Rijksmuseum (Amsterdam, 2005), 
 Traces & Omens, Noorderlicht (Groningen, 2005), 
 Warzone, Noorderlicht (Groningen, 2010), 
 Metropolis – City Life in the Urban Age, Noorderlicht (Groningen, 2011), 
 Visions of Earth, National Geographic (Washington, 2011), 
 Growth, Prix Pictet, teNeues (Kempen, 2011), 
 Modern Times, Rijksmuseum (Amsterdam 2014), 
 Mexico Megalopolis, Lannoo (Tielt, 2016),

Permanent Collections    

 – Rijksmuseum, Amsterdam, The Netherlands
 – Huis Marseille – Museum for Photography, Amsterdam, The Netherlands
 – Kunsthal, Rotterdam, The Netherlands
 – Ministry of Foreign Affairs, Art Collection, The Hague, The Netherlands
 – Nationaal Militair Museum, Soesterberg, The Netherlands
 – Haus der Geschichte der Bundesrepublik Deutschland, Bonn, Germany
 – German Historical Museum (DHM), Berlin, Germany
 – Industriemuseum Sachsen, Chemnitz, Germany
 – Stadtmuseum Berlin, Berlin, Germany
 – Ford Foundation, New York City
 – The Museum of Fine Arts Houston, Houston, USA

Solo exhibitions

 2001 Noorderlicht Photogallery, Groningen, The Netherlands, Tussen vijandige buren
 2003 Legermuseum, Delft, The Netherlands, Kabul
 2007 Kunsthal Rotterdam, Rotterdam, The Netherlands, The Never-Ending War
 2009 Kunsthal Rotterdam, Rotterdam, The Netherlands, A tribute to the Trabant
 2009 – 2010 Willy Brandt Haus, Berlin, Germany, Relics of the Cold War
 2009 – 2010 Deutsches Museum, Munich, Germany, Trabant: The Final Days of Production
 2010  Krasnoyarsk Museum Center, Krasnoyarsk, Siberia, Russia, Relics of the Cold War
 2012  Kunsthal, Rotterdam, The Netherlands, The Eyes of War
 2012  Anastasia Photo, New York City, Metropolis (Work in Progress)
 2014  Anastasia Photo, New York City, Relics of the Cold War
 2014 – 2015  German Historical Museum (DHM), Berlin, The Eyes of War
 2015  Arsenal, Nizhny Novgorod, Russia, The Eyes of War
 2015 – 2016  Huis Marseille – Museum for Photography, Amsterdam, The Netherlands, Metropolis
 2016  East Wing, Dubai, Metropolis
 2016  German Historical Museum (DHM), Berlin, Relics of the Cold War
 2016  Torch Gallery, Amsterdam, Metropolis
 2016  Dr. Bhau Daji Lad Mumbai City Museum, Mumbai, India, Metropolis

Group exhibitions

 2002  The Netherlands Photo Institute, Rotterdam, The Netherlands, Brandhaarden – Warzone
 2004  State Museum of the Political History of Russia, St. Petersburg, Russia, Warzone –  Dutch Photographers and International Conflicts
 2005  Noorderlicht Photofestival, Groningen, The Netherlands, Traces & Omens
 2006  Customs House, Sydney, Australia, Dutch Decade: Photography from The Netherlands
 2007 – 2008  Willy-Brandt-Haus, Berlin, Germany, Arbeit und Alltag 1951–1992: Fotografien von Roger Melis, Martin Roemers und Walter Vogel
 2009 – 2010  Ephraim-Palais, Stadtmuseum Berlin, Berlin, Germany, Fallmauerfall | 61 – 89 – 09 Grenzueberschreitung und Grenzerfahrung im Spiegel der Kunst
 2010 Duke University, Center for Documentary Studies, Durham USA, Daylight/CDS Photo Awards
 2010 Photofestival Bredaphoto, Breda, The Netherlands, Tilt
 2010 Noorderlicht Photofestival, Leeuwarden, The Netherlands, Warzone
 2011 Museum of Estonian Architecture, Tallinn, Estonia, Metropolis – City Life in the Urban Age
 2011 The Empty Quarter, Dubai, Metropolis 2.0
 2011 Noorderlicht Photofestival, Groningen, The Netherlands, Metropolis
 2011 Sony World Photography Festival 2011, London, San Francisco, Shanghai, São Paulo
 2011 Gemeente Museum Den Haag, The Hague, The Netherlands, Summer Exhibition
 2011 Photofestival Naarden, Naarden, The Netherlands, Let's face it
 2012 Photoville, Brooklyn, New York
 2013 Paris Photo, Paris
 2013 Photoville, New York City
 2013 Somerset House, Syngenta Photography Award 2013, London
 2013 ART Rotterdam, Rotterdam, The Netherlands
 2015 Acte2 Galerie, Paris, Urban Dreams
 2016 Biennial of Photography, Knokke-Heist, Belgium, Mexico Megalopolis

Awards
2006 World Press Photo, 2nd prize Portraits Stories The Never-Ending War

 2009 European Prize of Architectural Photography, Commendation Metropolis
 2010 Photo District News, USA, Notable Photo Books of 2010 Relics of the Cold War
 2010 Daylight/ CDS Photo Awards, USA, Project Prize: Honorable Mention Relics of the Cold War
 2010 Daylight/ CDS Photo Awards, USA, Work-in-Process Prize: Juror Pick Metropolis
 2011 World Press Photo, 1st prize Daily Life Stories Metropolis>
 2011 Sony World Photography Awards, Nomination The Eyes of War
 2013 Deutscher Fotobuchpreis, Nomination The Eyes of War

Bibliography 

 Eyemazing (NL), Martin Roemers, The Never-Ending War – Tyler Whisnand, No. 8, 2005
 Foto8 (UK), Relics – Jon Levy, March 2006
 Der Spiegel (DE), Bunkermentalitaet, No. 51, 2009
 The Wall Street Journal (US), The Little Car That Could (Sort Of): a Trabant Tribute – J.S. Marcus, April 24, 2009
 Photo District News (US), Notable Photo Books of 2010, Nov. 2010
 Newsweek (US), Hello, Seven Billion – Martin Roemers, November 7, 2011
 The Guardian Weekend (UK), Kolkata by Martin Roemers – Phil Daoust, May 21, 2011
 The Wall Street Journal (US), The Beauty and Brutality of Images That Reach Far Beyond the Headlines – Joell Weickgenant, May 13, 2011
 The New Yorker (US), Goings on About Town – Martin Roemers, April 2, 2012
 The New York Photo Review (US), Urban Speed – Ed Barnas, April 18, 2012
 The New York Times (US), Sunday Review. Living in The New Metropolis – Martin Roemers, May 6, 2012
 The New York Times (US), The Bustle and the Blur – Liz Robbins, July 28, 2013
 The Wall Street Journal (US), Collector's Eye: Anthony Terrana. A Periodontist's Photographic Passion – Ellen Gamerman, March 30, 2013
 Frankfurter Allgemeine Zeitung (DE), Blinde Blicke – Andreas Kilb, October 6, 2014
 Geo (DE), Der Rhytmus in Metropolis – Juergen Schaeffer, Sept. 2014
 Collector Daily (US), Martin Roemers, Relics of the Cold War @Anastasia Photo – Loring Knoblauch July 30, 2014
 European Photography (DE), Urbanics – The Contemporary City – Andreas Mueller Pohle, #98, 2015
 Cees Nooteboom – Wat het oog je vertelt. Essay: Het onzichtbare gezien: over het werk van
 Frankfurter Allgemeine Zeitung (DE), Wahnbilder einer versunkenen Epoche – Andreas Kilb, March 14, 2016
 Geo (FR), Marées urbaines – Jean Christoph Servant, Feb. 2016
 NRC Handelsblad (NL), Metropolis: chaos megasteden voelbaar – Tracy Metz, January 19, 2016
 The New Review, The Independent on Sunday (UK), Roadshow – Rachael Pells, January 10, 2016
 Photonews (DE), Der Fotograf Martin Roemers – Gunda Schwantje, Jan. 2016
 Martin Roemers, De Bezige Bij (Amsterdam, 2016),

References

External links
Martin Roemers’ official website

Dutch photographers
1962 births
Living people
People from Groningen (province)